David Harbater (born December 19, 1952) is an American mathematician at the University of Pennsylvania, well known for his work in Galois theory, algebraic geometry and arithmetic geometry.

Early life and education
Harbater was born in New York City and attended Stuyvesant High School, where he was on the math team. After graduating in 1970, he entered Harvard University.

After graduating summa cum laude in 1974, Harbater earned a master's degree from Brandeis University and then a Ph.D. in 1978 from MIT, where he wrote a dissertation (Deformation Theory and the Fundamental Group in Algebraic Geometry) under the direction of Michael Artin.

Research

Harbater's recent work on patching over fields, together with Julia Hartmann and Daniel Krashen, has had applications in such varied fields as quadratic forms, central simple algebras and local-global principles.

Awards and honors
In 1995, Harbater was awarded the Cole Prize for his solution, with Michel Raynaud, of the long outstanding Abhyankar conjecture.

In 2012, he became a fellow of the American Mathematical Society.

Selected publications

References

External links
Recollections of Arthur Rothstein, (Math Teammate of Harbater)
Cole Prize citation for David Harbater
 
Harbater's home page at Penn

1952 births
Living people
20th-century American mathematicians
21st-century American mathematicians
Group theorists
Fellows of the American Mathematical Society
Stuyvesant High School alumni
Harvard University alumni
Brandeis University alumni
Massachusetts Institute of Technology alumni
Scientists from New York City
Mathematicians from New York (state)
University of Pennsylvania faculty
Mathematicians at the University of Pennsylvania